The 1869 Princeton vs. Rutgers football game was played between Princeton and Rutgers on November 6, 1869. The rules governing play were based on the London Football Association's 1863 rules that disallowed carrying or throwing the ball. Therefore, the game more closely resembled soccer than gridiron football. Moreover, the match was played with a soccer ball. As a result, it is considered the first collegiate soccer match and the birth of soccer in the United States.

Because gridiron football developed from the rules of association football and rugby football, many also consider the game played on November 6 to be the first gridiron game and the first collegiate football game. Rutgers won the game 6–4.

Details and rules
Part of the first season of college football, the game took place on November 6, 1869 at a field on College Avenue (now the site of the College Avenue Gymnasium) in New Brunswick, New Jersey. Because the game was played at Rutgers, it was also played under Rutgers' rules. They were based on the Football Association's rules of the time, in which two teams of 25 players attempted to score by kicking the ball into the opposing team's goal. The teams played 10 "games" against each other. When a team scored a goal, it counted as the end of that game, and the team with the most goals after 10 games was the winner. It is clear that this format did not resemble the game of college football as known today. The first such game in the United States in which the ball is advanced by physically picking it up and running, where play is stopped by knocking down the ball carrier, and each team fields eleven members was played on June 4, 1875 between Tufts University and Harvard colleges. and then Yale on November 13. That game caused Yale to drop association football in favour of rugby.

William J. Leggett, later a distinguished clergyman of the Dutch Reformed Church, was the Rutgers captain; William Gummere, who later became chief justice of the Supreme Court of New Jersey, captained the New Jersey squad. The game was played in front of approximately 100 spectators. The players from Rutgers wore scarlet-colored turbans and handkerchiefs to distinguish themselves from the Princeton players. The scarlet of the Rutgers Scarlet Knights came from this episode.

Gameplay

As the first of the 10 games began, two players from each of the teams positioned themselves near the opponent's goal. This was presumably because the participants were hoping to easily score when the ball reached their territory on the field of play. On each team, there were eleven so-called "fielders" who were assigned to defend their own territorial area. There were 12 participants on each team that they named "bulldogs" who were the ones playing in the other team's territory.

Rutgers was the first to score a goal, as S. G. Gano and G. R. Dixon successfully kicked the ball across the Princeton goal. At some point early in the contest, the "flying wedge" play was first used as the team with the ball formed a wall-like formation of players, allowing them to charge at the defenders. This flying wedge tactic was successful early on for Rutgers because of their size disadvantage over Princeton . However, Princeton  countered the tactic when J.E. Michael, better known as "Big Mike", broke up the Rutgers' flying wedge during the fourth game. Princeton  took advantage and tied the score at 2–2.

A Rutgers player named Madison M. Ball, a wounded veteran of the American Civil War, used his quickness and kicking the ball with the heel of his foot to again take the lead in the contest. Whenever the ball entered Rutgers territory, Ball would get in front of it and use a heel-kick to prevent Princeton from scoring. Ball was able to successfully use that technique to set up Dixon to score another goal which gave Rutgers a 4–2 lead. Rutgers then allowed Princeton to score a goal as one of their players, whose identity is not known, had kicked a ball towards their own goal. It was blocked by a Rutgers player, but Princeton soon was able to take advantage to cut the lead down to 4–3. The Tigers scored on their next possession when they used a flying wedge play of their own led by Big Mike to march down the field to score to tie the game again at 4.

Rutgers captain John W. Leggett had a strategy for his team at this point. He suggested that the Rutgers team keep the ball low on the ground to counter the much taller players on Princeton. This strategy appeared to work as Rutgers easily scored the final two goals of the contest to win the first intercollegiate football game played 6 games to 4.

Princeton had more size, which would normally be an advantage on a field with 50 total players, but the Tigers had trouble kicking the ball as a team which is something Rutgers did very well. In a 1933 account, a Rutgers player from the game named John W. Herbert said that he thought Rutgers was the smaller team, but that they had more speed than Princeton .

Reports

Aftermath

In what might be considered a beginning to college football rivalries, immediately after Rutgers won this game, Princeton's players were literally run out of town by the winning Rutgers students. The Princeton students reportedly jumped in their carriages and quickly made the 20-mile trip back to their campus.

Fifty years after the historic first game, members of the 1869 Rutgers football team were honored at Homecoming ceremonies in 1918.

The last surviving player of Princeton, Robert Preston Lane (b. 1851) died in November 1938, while the last surviving Rutgers player, George H. Large (b. 1850) died in 1939.

In 1968, Arnold Friberg was commissioned by Chevrolet to create a painting commemorating the game.  His work The First Game was one of four works that he created to celebrate 100 years of college football.

References

1869 college football season
vs. Rutgers 1869
vs. Princeton 1869
1869 in sports in New Jersey
November 1869 sports events
History of soccer in the United States